The Chendamangalam Synagogue (Malayalam: ചേന്ദമംഗലം ജൂതപള്ളി) (Hebrew; בית הכנסת צ'נמנגלם) is one of the oldest known synagogues built by the Malabar Jews,in Chendamangalam, a village in the Ernakulam district of the coastal state of Kerala. It is dated to 1100 A.D, though the synagogue structure itself dates to 1420 A.D or 1614 A.D., making it the oldest synagogue in the Commonwealth of Nations. A tombstone recovered from Shingly was stored in this synagogue and is presently on display in the courtyard in front. This tombstone with the inscription of Sarah bat Israel is the oldest Jewish relic found in India, dating to 1270 A.D.  

After the entire congregation made aliyah to Israel in 1950s, the synagogue was defunct for decades. Today it serves as a Kerala Jews Lifestyle Museum for the Muziris Project, a conservation project by the Government of Kerala. The synagogue has been restored and has an exhibit open to visitors from 9:30 to 5:00 during the week.

History 

The hillocks at Kottayil Kovilakam are unique as the site of a Hindu temple, a Syrian Christian church, a mosque and a restored Jewish synagogue, all within 1 km of each other.

Here are remains of the Vypeenakotta Seminary built for Syrians in the 16th century by the Portuguese. Adjacent to the seminary is an old Syrian Catholic Church built in 1201. It is also the site of the first printing press in India.

Objects of Interest

Tombstone of Sarah bat Israel 
A tombstone recovered from Shingly was stored in this synagogue and is presently on display in the courtyard in front. This tombstone with the inscription of Sarah bat Israel is the oldest Jewish relic found in India, dating to 1270 A.D. (1581 Seleucid era).

Hekkal 
The Heichal of the Chendamangalam synagogue is one of the most ornately carved torah ark in kerala. The style of the ark is Italian with gilded filigree work. It bears the crown insignia of the tribe of Judah.

Golden Sefer Torah Crown 

This was a crown gifted by the Maharaja of Travancore to the Chendamangalam Jews. The crown was weighed 212 carats and was made of solid gold Studded with rubies and emeralds. A rimon from the Palayoor Synagogue was brought and stored in this synagogue. This was later purchased by the Paravur Synagogue which in turn sold it to the Kadavumbhagam Synagogue in Ernakulam. The crown was later taken to Israel and stored in moshav Nevatim. In 2008, thieves broke into the moshav and stole this crown. Its whereabouts are currently unknown.

Chendamangalam Jewish Cemetery 

There is also an abandoned Jewish cemetery behind the mosque, about 400 m from the synagogue, which has not been restored yet.

Gallery

See also 

 Cochin Jews
 Chendamangalam
 Muziris
 List of synagogues in Kerala
 History of the Jews in India
 Gathering of Israel
 Judaism
 Anjuvannam

References 

Jewish museums
Synagogues in Kerala
Synagogues preserved as museums